Harry Morton may refer to:
 Harry Morton (footballer) (1909–1974), English football goalkeeper for Aston Villa in the 1930s
 Harry Morton (restaurateur) (1981–2019), American restaurateur and founder of the restaurant chain Pink Taco
 Harry K. Morton (1905–1994), American lawyer and politician from New York
 Bob Morton (politician) (1934–2015), full name Harry Robert Morton, American politician from Washington
 Harry Kennedy Morton (1889–1956), vaudeville dancer and singer, and prizefighter